Issam al-Attar is a former Muslim Brotherhood leader, a symbol of resistance to Hafez al-Assad, and in exile in Aachen, Germany since the 1970s. He was born in 1927 in Syria. He was the second Supreme Guide of the Syrian Muslim Brotherhood, taking over from its founder, Mustafa al-Siba'i, in 1961. His sister, Najah al-Attar is the Vice President of Syria and is the only woman to have served in  the post, which she has held since 2006. Previously she was Minister of Culture from 1976 to 2000. His wife was assassinated by a death squad sent by Assad.

Attar was denied re-entry to Syria by the newly installed Ba'athist government following a hajj trip to Mecca in 1963, and has lived in exile in Germany since the 1970s. Attar was in turn removed from his position as Supreme Guide in 1980 as a result of poor health and due to repeated government victories in the Islamic uprising in Syria. He has led the Talaa’i organization in Germany since the late 1970s, which works mostly with non-Syrian Muslims. He still consults with the Syrian Muslim Brotherhood on Syria related issues.

See also
 Muslim Brotherhood of Syria

References

External links
 Muslim Brotherhood, Syria

1927 births
Syrian Sunni Muslims
Syrian exiles
Muslim Brotherhood of Syria politicians
Living people
People of the Islamic uprising in Syria
People from Damascus
Syrian dissidents
Syrian Salafis
Syrian expatriates in Germany